This is a list of winners and nominees for the BAFTA Award for Best Cinematography, which is presented to cinematographers, given out by the British Academy of Film and Television Arts since 1963.

Winners and nominees

1960s
 Best Cinematography – Black and White

 Best Cinematography – Colour

 Best Cinematography

1970s

1980s

1990s

2000s

2010s

2020s

See also
 Academy Award for Best Cinematography
 Independent Spirit Award for Best Cinematography
 Critics' Choice Movie Award for Best Cinematography
 American Society of Cinematographers Award for Outstanding Achievement in Cinematography in Theatrical Releases

References

External links
 

British Academy Film Awards
 
Awards for best cinematography
Awards established in 1963